Serkan Yanık (born 2 April 1987) is a Turkish professional footballer who last played as a right back for Giresunspor in the TFF First League.

Club career
Yanık, who was born in France, began his career with French club Stade Reims. He was transferred to Kocaelispor in 2007. Bucaspor acquired the right back in 2009, where he finished runners-up for the TFF First League title in 2009–10.

References

1987 births
Living people
Footballers from Toulouse
Turkish footballers
French people of Turkish descent
Kocaelispor footballers
Bucaspor footballers
Süper Lig players
Mersin İdman Yurdu footballers
TFF First League players
Association football defenders